The Worthing Symphony Orchestra is the professional orchestra for the town of Worthing.  It is the only professional orchestra in the English county of West Sussex.  Founded in 1926, the orchestra was the first municipal orchestra in Britain.

The WSO's principal conductor (1997 to present) is John S Gibbons.  The orchestra is led by Julian Leaper, who also leads the City of London Sinfonia.  As of 2008, the orchestra was made up of around 55-60 musicians.

The orchestra plays at the Assembly Hall in Worthing, which according to the WSO's principal conductor, John Gibbons, has some of the finest acoustics in Europe.  Notable musicians to have played with the WSO at the Assembly Hall include Julian Lloyd Webber, and Nicola Benedetti.

The WSO also accompanies competitors in the Sussex International Piano Competition.

See also
 Music of Sussex

References

External links
Background information on the WSO

British symphony orchestras
English orchestras
1926 establishments in England
Musical groups from West Sussex
Musical groups established in 1926
Organisations based in West Sussex
Worthing